, there were about 7,000 electric vehicles registered in Indiana.

Government policy
, the state government charges an annual registration fee of $150 for electric vehicles.

Charging stations
, there were 215 public AC level 2 charging stations and 19 DC charging stations in Indiana.

In July 2021, the Indiana Department of Transportation and Purdue University began testing pavement that can charge electric vehicles while they are driving; this project is the first of its kind in the United States.

Manufacturing
Indiana was historically a manufacturing hub for gasoline-powered cars, which has led many electric vehicle manufacturers to establish manufacturing hubs in the state.

By region

Indianapolis
, there were about 400 public charging stations in the Indianapolis metropolitan area.

References

Indiana
Road transportation in Indiana